The Golden Mickeys (Cantonese: 米奇金獎音樂劇) is a revue-style stage musical presented in the style of an awards ceremony, with characters from Disney films being winning or nominated for awards including heroism, villainy, friendship, adventurousness, and romance. 

The show originated on the Disney Cruise Line as a replacement for Morty the Magician's show, premiering in September 2003 aboard the Disney Wonder. In the fall of 2004, the show was brought to the Disney Dream while in dry dock. The show is performed in the premiere theatre on the ship, the Walt Disney Theater on Deck 4.

The show made its land debut in Hong Kong Disneyland, and took its final bow on July 26, 2015 to make room for the brand new show "Mickey and the Wondrous Book," premiering November 2015 in celebration of the park's 10th anniversary.

Disney Cruise Line version
On the cruise ships, the show features "Ensign Benson", a timid crew member who finds herself thrust into the role of "host" when the scheduled host (supposedly, the ship's captain) is missing at show time. Benson, not feeling confident in her role as host, receives encouragement from various (real) celebrities in the form of interactive video clips. She is also involved in several of the song and dance routines. These feature cast members in the costumes of characters from Snow White and the Seven Dwarfs, The Hunchback of Notre Dame, Tarzan, Mulan, One Hundred and One Dalmatians, Toy Story, Lady and the Tramp, Sleeping Beauty, Pocahontas, and The Lion King performing songs from these films. In 2011, it dismantled the songs and characters from Sleeping Beauty and Pocahontas which were moved to Disney's Believe that year and then the Golden Mickeys included old or new numbers from The Little Mermaid, Beauty and the Beast, Tangled and many other Disney movies.

The show pre-show area outside of the Walt Disney Theatre is set up to replicate a red carpet, placing guests within the typical role of celebrities. Outside of the theatre doors, "Rona Rivers" conducts interviews with audience members as they come up the red carpet to enter the show, all the while, a live video feed of the "celebrity interviews" is being shown on the two large screens in the front of the theatre.

Original cast members included Nadia Wahhab, Crystal Monee Hall, Mark Baratelli, Jeremiah James, Joshua Carlson, Danny Calvert, Tony Wichowski, Erik McEwen, Jessica Quarles, Emma Green, Jonathan Vetsich, and Michele Kaye. The Golden Mickeys was directed by Diane Paulus, who also directed The Donkey Show in New York City, and choreographed by Maria Torres, who co-choreographed Disney's Enchanted.

Show Soundtrack
The Princess and the Frog Medley
Let it Go (Frozen: 10th Anniversary Edition Only)
Who Knows Where a Dream Might Lead
Encore: Disney Fantasy Medley (The Golden Mickeys: 20th Anniversary Edition Only)

Hong Kong Disneyland version
A version of the show was performed at the Storybook Theatre in the Fantasyland area of Hong Kong Disneyland. The show was narrated in Cantonese, with simplified Chinese and English subtitles. All of the songs were performed in English. Here, the show began with a performance of the title song including a dance performance based around cast members preparing costumes and taking press photos of arriving celebrities. Footage of Disney characters arriving by limousine and entering the theatre along a red carpet was then projected on screens to the two sides of the stage before the characters entered through the auditorium aisle. This version of the show had a running commentary from the host Bebe who conducted interviews with Mickey Mouse and Minnie Mouse, along with Goofy, Donald Duck, and Pluto and was also involved in several of the song and dance routines. These featured cast members in the costumes of characters from Toy Story 2, The Hunchback of Notre Dame, Tarzan, Mulan, Lilo and Stitch, The Little Mermaid and Beauty and the Beast performing songs from these films. The show also included aerial acrobatics, martial arts, puppetry, and fireworks.

On July 26, 2015, the show took its final bow to make way for the show "Mickey and the Wondrous Book", debuted in November 2015, to celebrate the park's 10th anniversary. The news was officially announced on June 22, 2015, though there were rumours of the show coming to an end in early June. The last show of the day on 12–13,17-20,24-25/7 was reserved for Magic Access Members(the name for annual pass holders). Magic Access Members who had signed up for the performances could pick up their wrist bands at ticket booth number 1 upon showing their Magic Access Member card. They were given a souvenir package while entering the theatre, including 20 postcards with photos of the show printed at the front, as well as one of the four pins (Mickey, Minnie, Donald or Goofy holding a clapperboard)of the Golden Mickeys pin series released back in 2010. The audience members of the final performance at 19:15 on July 26, 2015 included 100 Magic Access Members and special guests invited by the park. Original cast members Angela Lam, Andy Au and Regrine Law, who were still performing till the very last day, were honoured during the farewell moment held right after the performance.

Show Soundtrack
 The Golden Mickeys Song
 Friendship
 You've Got a Friend in Me (Toy Story 2)
 Heroism
 Out There (The Hunchback of Notre Dame)
 Son of Man (Tarzan)
 I'll Make a Man Out of You (Mulan)
 Adventurer
 Hawaiian Roller Coaster Ride (Lilo & Stitch)
 Under the Sea (The Little Mermaid)
 Romance
 Beauty and the Beast
 Something There
 Beauty and the Beast Song
When You Wish upon a Star / Little Wooden Head (Pinocchio)
 Reprise of The Golden Mickeys Song

On December 13, 2017 "Bebe" made a cameo appearance on "the Christmas Cabaret presented by the Hong Kong Disneyland Entertainment and Costuming Team", a show held once a year to entertain cast members. Bebe did her introduction of the Golden Mickeys with slight changes to fit in the segment "Hong Kong Disneyland Costuming Catwalk Show", and performed Madonna's "Vogue".

Disney's Hollywood Studios version

Show Soundtrack
 The Golden Mickeys Song
 Friendship
 You've Got a Friend in Me (Toy Story 2)
 Heroism
 Out There (The Hunchback of Notre Dame)
 Son of Man (Tarzan)
 I'll Make a Man Out of You (Mulan)
 Adventurer
 Hawaiian Roller Coaster Ride (Lilo & Stitch)
 Under the Sea (The Little Mermaid)
 Romance
 Beauty and the Beast
 Something There
 Beauty and the Beast Song
When You Wish upon a Star / Little Wooden Head (Pinocchio)
 Reprise of The Golden Mickeys Song

External links 
 Disney Cruise Line The Golden Mickey Full Show
 HKDL The Golden Mickeys Final Full Show

References

Walt Disney Parks and Resorts entertainment
Disney Cruise Line
Fantasyland